Spotted cardinalfish is a common name for several fishes and may refer to:

Apogon maculatus
Fowleria variegata
Ostorhinchus maculiferus
Sphaeramia nematoptera